James Hood (1942–2013), one of the first two African Americans to enroll at the University of Alabama in 1963.

James Hood may also refer to:

 James Hood (Canadian football) (born 1961), American, played in the Canadian Football League
 Jimmy Hood (1948–2017), British politician
Jim Hood (born 1962), American politician
James Walker Hood (1831–1918), American Methodist bishop